Esa Olavi Peltonen (born 25 February 1947) is a Finnish former professional ice hockey player who played in the SM-liiga for Kärpät, Upon Pallo, HJK, HIFK and Kiekkoreipas. He was inducted into the Finnish Hockey Hall of Fame in 1990.

Esa Peltonen, a member of IIHF Hall of Fame, played as many as 277 games (93G/49A - 142pts.) for the Finnish national team. His 93 goals are the second best in Finnish ice hockey history (Lasse Oksanen 101). Esa Peltonen represented the Finnish national team in four Olympic tournaments (1968, 1972, 1976 and 1980). He played in 11 World Championships (1967–78). He was also on the Finnish team at the inaugural Canada Cup in 1976.

His son, Ville Peltonen, is one of the best in the history of the Finnish national team. 13 World Championships, 4 Olympic tournaments, 2 World Cups. In those aforementioned tournaments he has scored 108 points (46+62), which is by far the best in Finland. As is his 13 medals in those 19 tournaments. Peltonen has so far played 252 games for Finland (79G/100A - 179pts).

External links
Finnish Hockey Hall of Fame page
Esa Peltonen's stats on Elite Prospects
Esa Peltonen's stats on Hockey DB

1947 births
Living people
HIFK (ice hockey) players
Ice hockey players at the 1968 Winter Olympics
Ice hockey players at the 1972 Winter Olympics
Ice hockey players at the 1976 Winter Olympics
Ice hockey players at the 1980 Winter Olympics
IIHF Hall of Fame inductees
Oulun Kärpät players
Olympic ice hockey players of Finland
Sportspeople from Oulu